Pentaerythritol tetraacrylate (PETA or sometimes PETTA,PETRA) is an organic compound. It is a tetrafunctional acrylate ester used as a monomer in the manufacture of polymers. As it is a polymerizable acrylate monomer it is nearly always supplied with a polymerisation inhibitor such as MEHQ (monomethyl ether hydroquinone) added.

Uses
PETA is part of a family of acrylates used in epoxy resin chemistry and ultraviolet cure of coatings. Similar monomers used are 1,6-hexanediol diacrylate and  TMPTA trimethylol propane triacrylate. It is a derivative of pentaerythritol
One of the key uses of the material is in polymeric synthesis where it can form micelles and block copolymers.  
The molecule's acrylate group functionality enables the molecule to do the Michael reaction with amines. It is therefore sometimes used in epoxy chemistry enabling a large reduction in cure time. As the molecule has 4 functional acrylate groups it confers high cross-link density. Ethoxylation maybe used to produce ethoxylated versions which find use in electron beam curing. The material also has pharmaceutical uses

See also
 1,6-Hexanediol diacrylate
 Trimethylolpropane triacrylate
 Acrylic acid

External Websites
 Safety Data Sheet

References 

Acrylate esters
Monomers